Air Rum was an airline registered in Sierra Leone, though based in Amman owned by Jordanian business man Mohammad Ibrahim Abu Sheikh, Jordan, which operated leasing and charter flights out Queen Alia International Airport, Amman.

History
The airline was established in 2002 as a subsidiary of RUM Group by Mohammad Abu Sheikh, who served as President and General Manager. Services were somewhat limited as Air Rum was on the List of air carriers banned in the European Union due to safety concerns. Air Rum became inoperational in 2008 and was subsequently dismantled, in favor of Petra Airlines, another subsidiary of RUM Group.

Fleet

The Air Rum fleet consisted of a number of Lockheed L-1011 TriStar aircraft, the last of which went into storage in August 2008, marking the end of the airline's business.

Incidents and accidents
On 20 September 2005, an Air Rum aircraft full of Gambian football fans heading for Lima, Peru faked a fuel starvation emergency so that the flight had to divert to Piura. The fans were going to support their national team playing in the city for the 2005 FIFA U-17 World Championship.

References

External links 

 

Airlines banned in the European Union
Defunct airlines of Sierra Leone
Defunct airlines of Jordan
Airlines established in 2002
Airlines disestablished in 2008
2002 establishments in Sierra Leone
Jordanian companies established in 2002